Lost in Translation is a novel written by Nicole Mones, published by Bantam Dell in 1999. It is the story of an American woman trying to lose her past by living as a translator in China. Emotionally charged and erotic, this widely translated bestseller has been universally praised for its authoritative portrayal of a China rarely captured in contemporary fiction. The novel's accolades include the Kafka Prize for the year's best work of fiction by any American woman, the Pacific Northwest Bookseller's Association Book Award for the year's best novel from the five northwestern states, and the New York Times Book Review's Notable Book and Editor’s Choice.

Summary 
Expatriate translator Alice Mannegan spends her nights in Beijing's smoky bars, seeking fleeting encounters with Chinese men to blot out the shame of her racist father back in Texas. But when she signs on to an archaeological expedition searching for the missing bones of Peking Man in China's remote Northwest deserts, her world cracks open. As the group follows the trail of the Jesuit philosopher/paleontologist Teilhard de Chardin to close in on one of archaeology's greatest mysteries, Alice finds herself increasingly drawn to a Chinese professor who is shackled by his own painful memories. Love in all its forms–human, sexual, divine, between a nation and its history, a man and his past, a father and his daughter–drives the story to its breathtaking finish.

Reviews and comments 
 Julie Checkoway: "Isn't ancestry, one's place in a personal, familial and cultural lineage, a difficult fact to ignore or erase? It is the obsessive concern with this question that drives the plot of Nicole Mones's ambitious debut novel, Lost in Translation."
 Lisa See: "Mones has used her story to talk about race and racism, especially in the ways that Chinese and Americans view each other. (...) While Mones seems to be exploring issues of race and taboo, her treatment of them is finally muddled. Still, her search for (...) that enigmatic place where man and woman fall in love is thought-provoking, sometimes disturbing and undeniably entertaining."

In a blog interview discussing her works, Mones described Alice, the main character, as "one of the few characters who really seemed to write herself". Mones also recalls her past working in China as an inspiration for Alice.

"When I was young, I was close to a young man whose father was suspected of having committed a racially motivated murder during the Civil Rights movement in the U.S. in the early 1960s. The burden of second-hand guilt lay heavy on my friend, and he moved to Hong Kong and refused to return to America. Then, he was killed in an accident. Looking back, I think I started writing the novel a few years after his death in order to play out his story and give it an ending."

References

 Nicole Mones' official website: Lost In Translation: http://www.nicolemones.com/books/lost-in-translation/
 Book review by Julie Checkoway on BookPage: http://bookpage.com/reviews/173-nicole-mones-lost-translation#.Vpjf5hXhDIU
 Book review by Lisa See on The New York Times: https://www.nytimes.com/books/98/09/20/reviews/980920.20seelt.html
 Online blog "Land of Books" by Ognian Georgiev. Interview with Nicole Mones: http://landofbooks.org/2015/03/29/nicole-mones-night-in-shanghai-took-me-five-years/

1999 American novels
Novels set in China
Interpreting and translation in fiction
Works about translation